The 2008–09 Kategoria e Parë was the 62nd season of a second-tier association football league in Albania.

League table

Promotion playoffs

Relegation playoffs

References

 Calcio Mondiale Web

Kategoria e Parë seasons
2
Alba